is a Japanese professional wrestler, currently working for the Japanese professional wrestling promotion DDT Pro-Wrestling (DDT), where he is current KO-D Openweight Champion in his first reign.

Professional wrestling career

Independent circuit (2014–present) 
Higuchi made his professional wrestling debut at DDT Pro-Wrestling's DDT Dramatic Fanclub Vol. 1, event from October 18, 2014, where he defeated Kota Umeda. He worked a match at BJW/DDT/K-DOJO Toshikoshi Pro-Wrestling 2015, a cross-over event held between Big Japan Pro-Wrestling, DDT, and Kaientai Dojo from December 31, where he teamed up with Yoshihisa Uto, falling short to Harashima and Yuko Miyamoto in the Shuffle Tag Tournament. Higuchi participated in the Block B of the Pro Wrestling Noah 2018 Global League, where he scored 6 points after facing Go Shiozaki, Kaito Kiyomiya, Muhammad Yone, Takashi Sugiura, Atsushi Kotoge, Maybach Taniguchi and Cody Hall. At TJP The God Of Pro Wrestling - My Arms Fell! event of Tokyo Joshi Pro Wrestling from December 27, 2018, Higuchi teamed up with Antonio Honda in a losing effort to Disaster Box (Harashima and Yuki Ueno). He worked a match for Evolve/WWN, at EVOLVE 125, from April 4, 2019, where he defeated Curt Stallion. One day later, at WWNLive SuperShow - Mercury Rising 2019, on April 5, he challenged JD Drake for the WWN Championship but unsuccessfully.

DDT Pro-Wrestling (2014–present)
Higuchi is a multiple-time KO-D 6-Man Tag Team Champion, title which he won on different occasions. His first title reign began at Into The Fight 2016, where he teamed up with Kouki Iwasaki and Shunma Katsumata to defeat T2Hii (Kazuki Hirata, Sanshiro Takagi and Toru Owashi). In the second reign, he held the titles with Kouki Iwasaki and Mizuki Watase, winning them at Best Western Lariat Series 2017 on January 22, by defeating Shuten-dōji (Kudo, Masahiro Takanashi and Yukio Sakaguchi) in a three-way tag team match also involving Antonio Honda, Konosuke Takeshita and Trans-Am★Hiroshi.<ref>{{cite web | url = http://www.ddtpro.com/ddtpro/44536/ | script-title=ja:ベストウェスタンラリアットシリーズ2017開幕戦 in レンブラントホテル東京町田 | access-date=January 22, 2017 | work=DDT Pro-Wrestling | language=ja|author=Dramatic Dream Team}}</ref> In the third reign, he won the titles alongside fellow Eruption stablemates Yukio Sakaguchi and Saki Akai at DDT TV Show! #7 from June 20, 2020. Higuchi is also a KO-D Tag Team Champion, title which he won with Yukio Sakaguchi again under the Eruption banner, at Road to Ultimate Party 2020 on October 25. At Judgement 2018: DDT 21st Anniversary, Higuchi teamed up with Daisuke Sekimoto as SekiGuchi to defeat Harashima and Naomichi Marufuji for the KO-D Tag Team Championship.

On July 3, 2022, Higuchi won the 2022 King of DDT Tournament by defeating Naomi Yoshimura in the final, and consequently won the KO-D Openweight Championship.

Championships and accomplishments
DDT Pro-Wrestling
KO-D Openweight Championship (1 time, current)
KO-D Tag Team Championship (4 times) – with Shigehiro Irie (1), Daisuke Sekimoto (1), Yukio Sakaguchi (1) and Naomi Yoshimura (1)
KO-D 6-Man Tag Team Championship (3 times) – with Shunma Katsumata and Kouki Iwasaki (1), Kouki Iwasaki and Mizuki Watase (1), and Saki Akai and Yukio Sakaguchi (1)
King of DDT Tournament (2022)Japan Indie AwardsMVP Award (2022)
Newcomer Award (2014)Wrestling Observer Newsletter''
Ranked No. 4 on the top 10 of the 2015 Rookie Of The Year

References

External links

1988 births
Living people
Japanese male professional wrestlers
21st-century professional wrestlers
KO-D 6-Man Tag Team Champions
KO-D Tag Team Champions
KO-D Openweight Champions